Egon Coordes (born 13 July 1944) is a German former professional football player and coach.

Playing career
Coordes was born in Wesermünde, Germany. He began his career at Regionalliga North side TuS Bremerhaven 93 but quickly moved to the Bundesliga, playing the rest of his career at just two clubs: SV Werder Bremen and VfB Stuttgart as a defender. Although a rare goalscorer, he managed to score the 10,000th Bundesliga goal when he netted for VfB Stuttgart against Eintracht Frankfurt on 26 January 1974. He played one final season in the 2. Bundesliga after VfB Stuttgart suffered relegation before retiring in 1976, aged 31.

Coaching career
Coordes entered coaching with OSC Bremerhaven in the Regionalliga North and worked his way through to the post of assistant coach at FC Bayern Munich by 1984. He stepped up to being head coach at his former club VfB Stuttgart in 1986, but lasted just one season as the team finished a disappointing 12th. He returned to his old post at Bayern Munich, before again trying his hand as head coach of Hamburger SV in March 1992, but again fared poorly and was sacked after just six months.

This was the cue for Coordes to try his luck abroad as he moved to the UAE with Al-Nasr before returning to Europe with Austria Vienna. After a year with the Austrian high-flyers, he headed back to his native land with 2. Bundesliga side Hannover 96. Again, he struggled with German management as the club plunged into the Regionalliga for the first time in their history and Coordes was promptly sacked. After a spell back as Bayern Munich assistant coach, he moved to Switzerland for a season with FC Luzern before again heading out to the Middle East as the Iranian under-23 coach and later at Al-Khaleej of the UAE. Following a single season there, he again moved to Austria with amateur side FC Gatt, before again returning to work for Bayern Munich.

References

Living people
1944 births
German footballers
German football managers
Hannover 96 managers
Association football defenders
FC Bremerhaven players
SV Werder Bremen players
VfB Stuttgart players
Khor Fakkan Sports Club players
UAE Pro League players
Bundesliga players
2. Bundesliga players
Sportspeople from Bremerhaven
Expatriate football managers in Austria
Expatriate football managers in Iran
Expatriate football managers in Switzerland
Expatriate football managers in the United Arab Emirates
Hamburger SV managers
FK Austria Wien managers
FC Bayern Munich non-playing staff
VfB Stuttgart managers
FC Luzern managers
Bundesliga managers
German expatriate sportspeople in Austria
German expatriate sportspeople in Iran
German expatriate sportspeople in Switzerland
German expatriate sportspeople in the United Arab Emirates
Footballers from Bremen (state)